Roxanne is a feminine given name. It is derived from the Greek name Rhōxanē (Latinised to Roxana), used for Roxana, the wife of Alexander the Great, a derivative of the Persian Roshanak, meaning bright star. Rokh meaning face, Shan bright or glowing Ak meaning little one. رخشانک.
In Kurdish (Roj-an) as well as in Avesta (Rowc) it means "bright, sun, sunlight, sun god, day".

People
 Roxana, Bactrian princess and wife of Alexander the Great
 Roxanne Avent (born 1976), American film producer and movie studio executive
 Roxanne Barcelo (born 1985), Filipino-American actress, model and singer
 Roxanne Barker (born 1991), South African football goalkeeper
 Roxanne Beck, American singer and voice actress
 Roxanne Beckford (born 1969), American actress
 Roxanne Benjamin, American film producer, writer and director
 Roxanne Bovenberg (born 1989), Dutch handball player
 Roxanne Conlin (born 1944), United States Attorney for the Southern District of Iowa
 Roxanne Constantin, Canadian musician
 Roxanne Donnery American politician from New York
 Roxanne Dunbar-Ortiz (born 1939), American historian, writer and feminist
 Roxanne Dufter (born 1992), German speed skater
 Roxanne Emery (born 1984), English singer-songwriter, multi-instrumentalist and producer
 Roxanne Fontana (born 1959), Italian-American author and musician
 Roxanne Franck  (born 1998), French female handball player
 Roxanne Guinoo (born 1986), Filipino actress
 Roxanne Hart (born 1952), American actress
 Roxanne James (born 1966), Canadian politician
 Roxanne Jones (1928–1996), American politician from Pennsylvania
 Roxanne Kernohan (1960–1993), Canadian actress
 Roxanne Lowit, New York-based fashion and celebrity photographer
 Roxanne McKee (born 1980), English actress and model
 Roxanne Modafferi (born 1982), American mixed martial artist
 Roxanne Didier Nicholas (born 1992), St. Lucian dancer and beauty pageant titleholder
 Roxanne Pallett (born 1982), English actress and singer
 Roxanne Persaud, American politician from New York
 Roxanne Potvin (born 1982) Canadian bilingual singer, guitarist and songwriter
 Roxanne Pulitzer (born 1951), American novelist and actress
 Roxanne Qualls (born 1953), American mayor of Cincinnati, Ohio
 Roxanne Quimby (born 1950), American artist and businesswoman
 Roxanne Roberts (born 1954), American style writer for the Washington Post
 Roxanne "Roxy" Saint (born 1977) American singer, musician, video producer
 Roxanne Seeman (born 1954), American songwriter and lyricist
 Roxanne Shanté (born 1969), American hip hop musician
 Roxanne Starr, American graphic designer and comic book letterer
 Roxanne Swentzell (born 1962), American ceramist
 Roxanne Tong (born 1987), Hong Kong beauty pageant contestant
 Roxane Turcotte (born 1952), Canadian author 
 Roxanne Varza (born 1985), Iranian-American company executive
 Roxanne Wilson (born 1979), American businesswoman
 Roxanne Ashley Yu (born 1997), Filipino swimmer

Roxanna 

 Roxanna Bennett, Canadian poet
 Roxanna Brown, prominent authority on Southeast Asian ceramics and director of the Bangkok University's Southeast
 Roxanna Carrillo, Peruvian activist and feminist
 Roxanna June, playboy model
 Roxanna Panufnik, British composer of Polish heritage

Fictional characters
Roxanne "Roxy" Washington, a Marvel character known as Bling!
Roxanne Ritchie, a TV news reporter in the movie Megamind
Roxanne, the high school love interest of Max Goof in A Goofy Movie
Roxy Lalonde, via Homestuck.
Dr. Roxanne Vanderwheele, an archeologist from the cartoon "Tutenstein".
Roxanne “Roxy” The Wolf, one of the animatronics in Five Nights at Freddy’s: Security Breach.

See also
 Roxanne (disambiguation)
 Roxann
 Roseanne (name)
 Roshanak (Origin of this given name)

Feminine given names